Not a Feather, but a Dot is an hour-long documentary film on the history, perceptions, stereotypes and changes in the Indian American community. The film discusses topics such as the growth of Hinduism in the United States, the origin of the stereotypes surrounding the Indian-American community, the early Indian migrants and events that have shaped the Indian-American community, and members of the Indian-American community that are changing "traditional" perceptions. It is narrated by filmmaker Teju Prasad who infuses his personal experience, historical analysis from academics, and experiences of other Indian Americans breaking "traditional ground." The film has been screened in New York, Washington DC, New Brunswick, NJ, Durham, NC,   and San Francisco, as well as the 2012 Jersey City Film Festival.

Cast
Vijay Prashad as himself
Priya Anjali Rai as herself
Sonia Dara as herself
Kevin Negandhi as himself
Sheetal Shah as herself
Teju Prasad as himself

References

External links 
 
 

Documentary films about Asian Americans
Indian diaspora in the United States
Films about Indian Americans
2012 films
2012 documentary films
American documentary films
2010s English-language films
2010s American films